Raimond Kolk (8 February 1924 Saru Parish, Võru County – 3 November 1992 Stockholm) was an Estonian writer and critic.

From 1942 to 1943 he studied at the Teachers' Seminary of the University of Tartu. In 1944, he fled to Finland because of German mobilization. In 1944, he moved to Sweden. From 1958 to 1963 he studied at Stockholm University, taking courses in political science, national economy and statistics. In 1963 he graduated from the university as a candidate in philosophy. From 1972 to 1989 he worked as the economic director of the Swedish Food Administration in Uppsala.

He did collaboration with several Estonian publications in exile, e.g. political journal Radikaaldemokraat, cultural journal Sõna, journal Tulimuld, newspaper Teataja.

He died in 1992. He is buried in Lidingö Cemetery.

Selected works
 1946: poetry collection "Ütsik täht" ('Lone Star')
 1957: poetry collection "Müüdud sõrmus" ('Sold Ring')
 1958: novel "Sulajää" ('Melting Ice')
 1977: poetry collection "Kiri" ('Letter')

References

1924 births
1992 deaths
Estonian male poets
Estonian male novelists
Estonian male short story writers
20th-century Estonian writers
University of Tartu alumni
Stockholm University alumni
People from Rõuge Parish
Estonian World War II refugees
Estonian emigrants to Sweden